Shilton is a surname and given name. Notable people with the name include: 

Billy Shilton (born 1998), British Paralympic table tennis player
John Shilton (1861–1899), English cricketer, rugby and football player
Lance Shilton (1921–1998), Australian Anglican cleric
Leni Shilton, Australian poet, teacher and researcher
Les Shilton (1923–1995), Australian politician
Peter Shilton (born 1949), British football player
Sam Shilton (born 1978), British football player

given name
Shilton D'Silva (born 1992), Indian football player
Shilton dos Santos, Brazilian basketball player
Shilton Paul, Indian football player